Cyclamen intaminatum (= Cyclamen cilicium var. intaminatum) is a perennial flowering plant growing from a tuber, native to oak woodland in scattered spots at  in western Turkey. It is similar to Cyclamen cilicium, but smaller.

Etymology
The species is named intāminātum "undefiled", from the stem of contāmen (= -tagmen) "pollution", from tangō "I touch", because of the unmarked petals.

Description
Leaves are almost round and dark green variegated with silver.

Flowers are white to light pink, with no spot of darker color on the nose as in many other cyclamens.

References

External links

Cyclamen Society
Pacific Bulb Society
Paghat's Garden

IPNI Listing
Kew Plant List

intaminatum

fr:Cyclamen cilicium#Un cyclamen nain